This is a list of supermarket chains in the Czech Republic.

Supermarkets

Speciality chains

Hobby markets & DIY stores

Home improvement stores 

TOTO nábytek             1           TOTO nábytek

Drugstore chains

See also 
List of supermarkets

References

Supermarkets

Czech Republic